Rainer Schubert (12 October 1941 – 13 August 2014) was a German hurdler. He competed in the 400 metres hurdles at the 1968 Summer Olympics and the 1972 Summer Olympics, representing West Germany.

References

1941 births
2014 deaths
Athletes (track and field) at the 1968 Summer Olympics
Athletes (track and field) at the 1972 Summer Olympics
German male hurdlers
Olympic athletes of West Germany
Place of birth missing